Renoma (formerly named Powszechny Dom Towarowy Renoma, Wertheim) is a shopping mall in Wrocław, and was once the biggest as well as the most high-end department store in the city. It is situated at 40 Świdnicka Street which connects the Market Square with Piłsudski Street in the historical centre of the city and Tadeusza Kościuszki Square. Renoma was reopened on 25 April 2009, after major modernisation works.

History

Pre-war 

In 1927, the Wertheim consortium in Berlin announced a contest for designing a department store in Wroclaw (then Breslau) city center. Various renowned local architects submitted their projects: Erich Mendelsohn, Werry Roth, Theodor Effenberg and Herman Dernburg, whose concept won. Dernburg’s design was based on steel framework and at the time became the biggest department store in Breslau, encompassing 35,000 square meters and also the largest building of steel framework construction in Europe.  In order to realize the project, a few buildings including well prospering hotel and 12 tenements in the location were demolished. All the works were finished in three years and Wertheim Department Store was opened on 2 April 1930.  Thanks to Dernsburg’s visionary modern architecture, spacious stores and first use of escalators in the region of Lower Silesia, the department store turned out to be a successful project. Famous among customers  was the very well supplied Toy Store display which was composed out of moving toy trains. At the time an idea to expand the store area further into the Savatorplatz  existed however due to the Big Crisis it was dismissed. The Jewish Wertheim family did not enjoy the store’s success for long, as fascists came to power and as a result of series of anti-semitic actions they were forced to sell the store to AWAG (Allgemeine Warenhaus Gesellschaft). AWAG limited the retail activity of the store. Moreover, the famous luxury restaurant with terraces with panoramic view of the city was turned into a military canteen. On 12 March 1945 the building was heavily damaged in the course of bombing. Even though it was on fire for several days, the steel framework as well as some parts of ceramic elevation managed to survive.

Post war 
Soon after the end of the war Renoma was renovated and in 1947 a new department store named Powszechny Dom Towarowy aka Pedet was opened. Even though the building lost its famous pre-war glamour it was the biggest department store in Poland. The ground floor accommodated food stores, a drugstore and a ceramics shop, and the first fabrics store was located on the first floor. Furthermore, in 1948 the store’s offer was expanded by opening a confectionery outlet and a kindergarten. Słowo polskie (“The Polish Voice”) newspaper announced a competition for naming the store. ‘Renoma’ (‘Renown’) was selected as the winning name since it alludes to the pre-war fame and glamour of the store. In 1977 Renoma was added to the heritage list. In the late 1990s Renoma was privatised and in 1998-1999 modernization took place. The first floor was named Galeria Centrum. In 2005-2009 the new owner Centrum Development & Investments performed a thorough modernisation. CDI decided to strictly reinvent the original concept of the building together with expanding the building according to the original idea from the 1930s. Modernisation took place under the guidance of the restorers. The grand opening of the new Renoma took place on 25 of April 2009. Hewlett-Packard is currently hiring some space on the second, fourth, fifth and sixth floors for their outsourcing projects.

Architecture 

In 1928 the project of Professor Herman Dernburg won the first prize in the architectural competition for the building design. Derburg applied classical solutions for a department store, with two huge courtyards (covered with glass ceilings on the first floor level). It made indoors full of daylight and good air circulation. The building had a horizontal elevation layout, with seven storeys. The ground floor was equipped with huge display windows, and higher floors had horizontal windows. Both corners facing Swidnicka street were rounded. The façade of the store was characterised by the rows of windows and decorative cornices below them. Elevation details were given special attention. Ulrich Nitschke and Hans Klakow are the authors of façade elements such as ceramic cornices, human head sculptures, fleurons and masts. The main entrance faced Swidnicka Street. The ground floor and four storeys were dedicated to the retail area. Offices and food service areas occupied the two highest floors.

Modernisation 
The design work for extension of Renoma and renovation of the pre-war building commenced in 2005. The investor engaged in the restoration of the splendour of the former Wertheim, without compromising the extension of the existing building. The development turned out to be a huge conservator guided business task. During the renovation of the historical building of Renoma the focus was on the preservation of the layout of the internal structure and the restoration of the original form of the façade, with its characteristic details: ceramic tiles and decorative elements, gold decorated heads and flowers. The renovation of the historical building of Renoma was closely supervised by the conservator of monuments.

Awards 
The modernised Renoma store has been awarded a number of prizes and nominations including:
 CEE Retail Real Estate Awards: 1st place In the category: Best modernization of the year (2010)
 The best Architectural Project of the year 2009. The prize was awarded by the users of scyscrapercity.com portal (2010)
 Finalist of the „Building of the Year 2010” competition, organized at the International Architecture Festival in Barcelona (Convencions Internacional de Barcelona - CCIB)
 A nominee for a prestigious Mies van der Rohe Award 2011 (November 2010)

Facts and Figures 
 After modernization Renoma doubled it area up to 100 000 sq. m.
 Total usable building area: 99.500 sq. m
 Retail area (five storeys): 31.000 sq. m; 120 stores and boutiques
 Office area (three storeys): 10.068 sq. m
 Number of parking spaces: 630

References

Bibliography

External links 
 renoma-wroclaw.pl

Buildings and structures in Wrocław
Shopping malls in Poland
Tourist attractions in Wrocław
Art Deco architecture in Poland